Serangoon is a planning area and residential town located in the North-East Region of Singapore.

Serangoon is bordered by these planning areas – Sengkang to the north, Hougang to the east, Ang Mo Kio and Bishan to the west, as well as Toa Payoh to the south. Serangoon planning area has a total of seven subzones: Serangoon Central, Lorong Chuan, Upper Paya Lebar, Serangoon Garden, Serangoon North, Seletar Hills and Serangoon North Industrial Estate.

Transportation
The original Serangoon bus interchange was opened on 13 March 1988 along Serangoon Central. It later relocated to nex on 3 September 2011.

A large part of the North East MRT line runs in parallel with this arterial road. Stations that are located along this road are from Little India to Kovan.

Road network
Upper Serangoon Road is an important road being one of the oldest and busiest roads, links the North-East region with Central area

Other important main roads include Yio Chu Kang Road, Upper Paya Lebar Road, Bartley Road, Braddell Road and Ang Mo Kio Avenue 3.

The CTE (Central Expressway) at the west of the town provides a link to Seletar Airport, Toa Payoh and CBD (Central Business District).

Education
, this area has a total of 5 primary schools, 4 secondary schools and Nanyang Junior College.

Politics
Serangoon Neighbourhood 1, some parts of Neighbourhood 2 and Serangoon Garden fall under the Aljunied GRC (Serangoon division), served by the Workers' Party, while the area surrounding Upper Paya Lebar Road lies within the Aljunied GRC Paya Lebar division. Prior to 2006, the Serangoon division belonged to the Marine Parade GRC, which administers Serangoon Neighbourhoods 2, 3 and 4 in the Braddell Heights division till this day. Neighbourhood 5 in Serangoon North falls under the Ang Mo Kio GRC (Jalan Kayu division).

See also
Serangoon North
Serangoon Garden
Nex

Gallery

References

Sources
Victor R Savage, Brenda S A Yeoh (2003), Toponymics – A Study of Singapore Street Names, Eastern Universities Press,

External links
 Masterplan 2003 – Urban Redevelopment Authority
 Serangoon Planning Report 1995

 
Places in Singapore